Goodman Dlamini is a South African footballer who plays as a midfielder.

Career
On 20 May 2018, he scored the winning goal in the Nedbank Cup final to lead Free State Stars to their first title in 24 years.

References

1985 births
Living people
South African soccer players
People from Clermont, KwaZulu-Natal
Association football midfielders
AmaZulu F.C. players
Free State Stars F.C. players
South African Premier Division players